Thulium fluoride may refer to:

 Thulium(II) fluoride (Thulium difluoride), TmF2
 Thulium(III) fluoride (Thulium trifluoride), TmF3